The St. Louis Observer was an abolitionist newspaper established by Elijah Lovejoy, a New England Congregationalist minister, in St. Louis, Missouri.  After the newspaper's printing press was destroyed for a third time by a pro-slavery mob, the newspaper was re-located to Alton, Illinois, and renamed the Alton Observer.

See also
Abolitionism in the United States
Elijah Lovejoy
Alton Observer

References 
 Vaughn, Stephen L. (editor) Encyclopedia of American Journalism (Routledge, 2009) p. 4

Defunct newspapers published in Missouri
Abolitionist newspapers published in the United States
Publications established in 1834
Publications disestablished in 1836
1836 disestablishments